Harry R. Allcock (born April 8, 1932, Loughborough, England) is Evan Pugh Professor of chemistry at Pennsylvania State University.

Allcock obtained his B.Sc. in 1953 and his Ph.D. in 1956, both at the University of London. He is notable for his work on the "inorganic rubbers" with a phosphorus-nitrogen backbone (polyphosphazenes). With James E. Mark and Robert West, Allcock co-authored the book Inorganic Polymers (Oxford University Press, 2005). He also wrote Introduction to Materials Chemistry (John Wiley & Sons, 2008), Chemistry and Applications of Polyphosphazenes (Wiley-Interscience, 2002, and co-authored Contemporary Polymer Chemistry (Prentice Hall, 2003) with Fred Lampe and James Mark.

Allcock was elected as a member into the National Academy of Engineering in 2014 for the development of polyphosphazenes, a new class of biomaterials.

Awards and honors
 American Chemical Society National Award in Polymer Chemistry (1984)
 Guggenheim Fellow (1986/1987)
 American Institute of Chemists Chemical Pioneer Award (1989)
 American Chemical Society National Award in Materials Chemistry (1992)
 A.C.S. Herman Mark Award in Polymer Chemistry (1994)
 Penn State Graduate Commencement Speaker (1997 & 2005)
 Honorary degree from Loughborough University, U.K. (2006)
 American Chemical Society National Award in Applied Polymer Science (2007)
 National Academy of Engineering member (2014)

See also
 Poly(dichlorophosphazene)

References

Living people
British expatriate academics in the United States
Pennsylvania State University faculty
British chemists
Alumni of the University of London
1932 births